Idaea semisericea is a moth of the family Geometridae first described by Warren in 1897. It is found in the north-eastern Himalayas of India, Sri Lanka, Borneo, Java and the Philippines.

Adult has deep greyish wings with darker fasciae. Host plants of the caterpillar include Falcataria moluccana.

Two subspecies are recognized.
Sterrha comparanda neanica Prout, 1938 - Borneo
Sterrha comparanda trettesensis Prout 1938 - Java

References

External links

Moths of Asia
Moths described in 1897